McGregor Independent School District is a public school district based in McGregor, Texas (USA).

In 2009, the school district was rated "academically acceptable" by the Texas Education Agency.

Schools
McGregor High School (Grades 9–12)
H.G. Isbill Junior High (Grades 6–8)
McGregor Elementary (Grades 2–5)
McGregor Primary (Grades PK-1)

References

External links
McGregor ISD

School districts in McLennan County, Texas